Antonetti is a surname derived from the Antonius root name. Notable people with the surname include:

Chris Antonetti, baseball executive
Frédéric Antonetti (born 1961), football manager
Lorenzo Antonetti (1922–2013), Roman Catholic cardinal
Olga Antonetti (1945–1968), Venezuelan beauty pageant winner

See also

Antonetta
Antonietti

Patronymic surnames